Carlos Mateus Ximenes (born January 6, 1986) is an East Timorese footballer who plays as midfielder for Vemasse Python and the Timor-Leste national team.

References

External links

1986 births
Association football midfielders
East Timorese footballers
Timor-Leste international footballers
Living people
A.D. Baucau players